The 2013 ITF Men's Circuit was the 2013 edition of the entry level tour for men's professional tennis, and the third tier tennis tour below the Association of Tennis Professionals, World Tour and Challenger Tour. It was organised by the International Tennis Federation (ITF) which also organizes the ITF Women's Circuit, an entry level tour for women's professional tennis. Later tournaments were organized to offer either $10,000 or $15,000 in prize money and tournaments which offered hospitality to players competing in the main draw to give additional ranking points which are valid under the ATP ranking system, and were organized by a national association or approved by the ITF Men's Circuit Committee.

The tournaments were played on a rectangular flat surface, commonly called a tennis court. Tennis is played on a variety of surfaces and each surface has its own characteristics which affect playing style. The four main types of courts, depending on the materials used for the surface, are clay, hard, grass and carpet courts, with the ITF classifying five different pace settings ranging from slow to fast.

Point distribution

Key

Month

April

May

June

References

External links
International Tennis Federation official website
ITF Futures tournaments
ITF Futures results archive

 04-06